Stabat Mater for solo alto and orchestra, RV 621, is a composition by the Italian baroque composer Antonio Vivaldi on one of the Sorrows of Mary. It was premiered in Brescia in 1712.

Instrumentation

The work is scored for violins I & II, violas, solo alto or countertenor and basso continuo.

Movements

Vivaldi's Stabat Mater only uses the first ten stanzas of the hymn. The music is keyed in F minor, and is generally slow and melancholy, with allegro only being used once in the Amen, and all the other movements not going faster than andante. Movements 4, 5, and 6 are identical to the first three musically.
The composition is structured into nine movements as follows:
 Stabat mater dolorosa
 Cujus animam gementem
 O quam tristis et afflicta
 Quis est homo
 Quis non posset contristari
 Pro peccatis suae gentis
 Eia mater, fons amoris
 Fac ut ardeat cor meum
 Amen

In popular culture
A piano transcription of this work was featured prominently in the 1999 film The Talented Mr. Ripley.

References

External links

Vivaldi
Compositions by Antonio Vivaldi
1727 compositions